Popcorn.js is an open source JavaScript library for HTML5 media developers, freely available under the MIT License. It uses the native HTMLMediaElement properties, methods and events, normalizes them into an API, and provides a plugin system. Extensible support for playing non-native media (ex: YouTube, Vimeo, SoundCloud) is available through the normalized API via wrappers. Popcorn.js is part of a Mozilla program to promote Web video creation via open standards, and though outside Web development communities, has been named by sources such as Wired.com as one of technologies with the greatest potential in the future of video online.

References

External links
 official website

JavaScript libraries